One True Love is a 2000 American television film directed by Lorraine Senna.

Cast 
 David Hasselhoff - Mike Grant
 Terry Farrell - Dana Boyer
 Paget Brewster - Tina
 Cameron Finley - Corey
 Karl Pruner - Phil Davis
 Doris Roberts - Lillian
 Meg Hogarth - Maureen Grant 
 Greg Ellwand - Paul Grant
 Katie Boland - Laura
 Marnie McPhail - Lucy Pearl

References

External links 

2000 television films
2000 films
2000s English-language films